Fatima Guedes is a Brazilian singer and composer. She has also appeared in two short films, Shadows of the Past (2012), and Strike (2010).

Discography
Odeon 100 Anos 3 (2005)
Outros Tons (2006)
Betrayos Me (2007)

References

External links

Living people
Brazilian composers
21st-century Brazilian women singers
21st-century Brazilian singers
1958 births